Alden Township is the name of some places in the U.S. state of Minnesota:

Alden Township, Freeborn County, Minnesota
Alden Township, St. Louis County, Minnesota

See also
Alden Township (disambiguation)

Minnesota township disambiguation pages